Mabson is an unincorporated community in Dale County, Alabama, United States.

History
A post office operated under the name Mabson from 1900 to 1904.

References

Unincorporated communities in Dale County, Alabama
Unincorporated communities in Alabama